Zainabia ( lit. of Zainab) is a term used by various Shiite movements and institutions working to promote the Shia Islam. Zainab is the daughter of Ali and the granddaughter of Muhammad, thus the member of Ahl al-Bayt.

References 

Shia Islam
Arabic words and phrases